Anna University in Tamil Nadu, India has many affiliated institutions. For the full list, see below:

Anna University's Campuses or University Colleges  - affiliated to Anna University

Headquarters 
Anna University is headquartered in Chennai and has regional offices in Coimbatore, Tiruchirappalli, Madurai, and Tirunelveli.

Coimbatore region
The Coimbatore headquarters has 207 affiliated colleges Under Anna University

Chennai region 
The Headquarters of Chennai has 179 Colleges

Trichy region
The Trichy or Tiruchirappalli headquarters has 89 colleges Under Anna University

Tirunelveli region 
Tirunelveli Headquarters have 72 colleges under Anna university

Tamil Nadu Government's Engineering Colleges affiliated to Anna University

Tamil Nadu Government-Aided Engineering Colleges affiliated to Anna University

Self - Financing Colleges affiliated to Anna University

Chennai region  
List of Anna University affiliated colleges in Chennai Region 
Sri Sai Ram Engineering College
S K R Engineering College
 Loyola-ICAM College of Engineering and Technology
 Easwari Engineering College (Autonomous)

Kanchipuram 
List of Anna University approved colleges in Kanchipuram Region
Aksheyaa College of Engineering
 Anand Institute of Higher Technology
 Apollo Priyadarshanam Institute of Technology
 Arignar Anna Institute of Science and Technology
 Asan Memorial College of Engineering and Technology
 Chennai Institute of Technology
GKM College of Engineering and Technology
 Gopal Ramalingam Memorial Engineering College
Jaya Engineering College
 Jeppiaar Engineering College
 Kalsar College of Engineering
 KCG College of Technology
 Kings Engineering College
 Madha Engineering College
 Misrimal Navajee Munoth Jain Engineering College
 Pallavan College of Engineering
 Rajalakshmi Engineering College
 Rajiv Gandhi College of Engineering
 Saveetha Engineering College
 Shree Motilal Kanhaiyalal Fomra Institute of Technology
 Shri Andal Alagar College of Engineering
 Sree Sastha Institute of Engineering and Technology
 Sri Muthukumaran Institute Of Technology
 Sri Sairam Institute of Technology
 Sri Sai Ram Engineering College
 Sri Sivasubramaniya Nadar College of Engineering
 Sri Venkateswara College of Engineering
 St. Joseph's College of Engineering
Thangavelu Engineering College
 Thirumalai Engineering College
 Valliammai Engineering College
 Vi Institute of Technology

Namakkal 
J.K.K.Nattraja College of Engineering and Technology
Vetri Vinayaha College of Engineering and Technology
Sengunthar College of Engineering

Tiruvallur 
List of Anna University approved colleges in Tiruvallur Region

 Aalim Muhammed Salegh College of Engineering
 Alpha College of Engineering
 Apollo Engineering College
 Bhajarang Engineering College
 B K R College of Engineering and Technology
 Easwari Engineering College
 Gojan School of Business and Technology
 Indira Institute of Engineering and Technology
 Jaya Engineering College
 Jaya Suriya Engineering College
 JNN Institute of Engineering
 Magna College of Engineering
 Panimalar Engineering College
 Panimalar Institute of Technology
 Prathyusha Engineering College
 Rajalakshmi Institute of Technology
 RMD Engineering College
 R.M.K. College of Engineering and Technology
 RMK Engineering College
 S.A. Engineering College
 SKR Engineering College
 Sree Sastha Institute of Engineering and Technology
 Sriram Engineering College
 Sri Venkateswara College of Engineering and Technology
 St. Peter's College of Engineering and Technology
 Velammal Engineering College
 Velammal Institute of Technology
 RVS Padmavathi collage of Engineering and technology

Tiruchengode 
List of Anna University approved colleges in Tiruchengode Region

 Vivekanandha College of Engineering for Women
K.S.RANGASAMY COLLEGE OF TECHNOLOGY (AUTONOMOUS) 
K.S.R. COLLEGE OF ENGINEERING (AUTONOMOUS) 
K.S.R. INSTITUTE FOR ENGINEERING AND TECHNOLOGY

Vellore
List of AICTE approved colleges in Vellore include

 Bharathidasan Engineering College
 C. Abdul Hakeem College of Engineering & Technology
Kingston Engineering College

Tiruvannamalai

List of AICTE Approved colleges in Tiruvanamalai 
 Arulmigu Meenakshi Amman College of Engineering
 SKP Engineering College
 Thiruvalluvar College of Engineering and Technology
 Arunai College of Engineering
 Sri Balaji Chokalingam Engineering College, Arani

Viluppuram 
List of AICTE approved colleges in Viluppuram

 Annai Teresa College of Engineering
 E.S Engineering College
 Idhaya Engineering College for Women
 IFET College of Engineering 
 Mailam Engineering College
 V.R.S College of Engineering and Technology

Tiruchirappalli Region 
 Kurinji College of Engineering and Technology
 Mahalakshmi Engineering College
 M.A.M College of Engineering
 Arasu Engineering College
 Mookambigai College of Engineering
 K.Ramakrishnan College of technology
 SRM TRP Engineering college
 A.V.C College of Engineering
 E.G.S Pillay Engineering College
 MRK Institute of Technology
 CK College of Engineering and Technology
 Ariyalur Engineering College
 Anjali Ammal Mahalingam Engineering College
 Parisutham Institute of Technology and Science
 Dhanalakshmi Srinivasan Institute of Research and Technology
 Saranathan college of Engineering
 Sir Isaac Newton College of Engineering and Technology
 Arifa Institute of Technology
 Sembodai Rukmani Varatharajan Engineering College
 Dr. Navalar Nedunchezhiyan College of Engineering
 Krishnasamy College of Engineering and Technology
 St. Anne’s College of Engineering and Technology
Kongunadu College of Engineering and Technology (Autonomous)

Coimbatore Region
List of Anna University approved colleges in Coimbatore Region

 Al Ameen Engineering College, Erode
 KPR Institute of Engineering and Technology, Coimbatore
 Adhiyamaan College of Engineering, Hosur
 Adithya Institute of Technology
 Bannari Amman Institute of Technology, Sathyamangalam
CSI College of Engineering, Ketti
Dr. Mahalingam College of Engineering and Technology, Pollachi
velalar College of Engineering and Technology, Erode
Erode Sengunthar Engineering College, Thudupathi, Erode
 Info Institute of Engineering, Coimbatore
 Institute of Road and Transport Technology, Erode
 GEM College of Information Technology, Tiruppur
Kalaignar Karunanidhi Institute of Technology
 Kalaivani College of Technology, Coimbatore
 Kathir College of Engineering
 KGiSL Institute of Technology
 King College of Technology
 Kongu Engineering College, Perundurai, Erode
 Knowledge Institute of Technology, Salem
 K. S. Rangasamy College of Technology, Thiruchengode
 KTVR Knowledge Park for Engineering and Technology
 Kumaraguru College of Technology, Coimbatore
 KV Institute of Management and Information Studies, Coimbatore
 Maharaja Institute of Technology, Arasur, Coimbatore
 Paavai College of Engineering, Pachal
 Paavai Engineering College, Pachal
 Pavai College of Technology, Pachal
 PPG Institute of Technology
 PSG Institute of Technology and Applied Research, Neelambur, Coimbatore
 Shree Venkateshwara Hi-Tech Engineering College, Gobichettipalayam
 SNS College of Engineering, Coimbatore
 SNS College of Technology, Coimbatore
 Sona College of Technology, Salem	
 Sri Krishna College of Engineering & Technology, Kuniamuthur, Coimbatore
 Sri Ramakrishna Institute of Technology, Coimbatore
 Tamilnadu College of Engineering, Karumathampatti, Coimbator
 Vims vivekananda institute of management studies , Coimbatore
V.S.B COLLEGE OF ENGINEERING TECHNICAL CAMPUS ,COIMBATORE

Tirunelveli Region

Kanniyakumari District
CAPE INSTITUTE OF TECHNOLOGY ,LEVINJIPURAM
 Amrita College of Engineering and Technology
 Annai Vailankanni College of Engineering
 Arunachala College of Engineering for Women
 Bethlahem Institute of Engineering
 C.S.I. Institute of Technology
 DMI Engineering College
 Good Shepherd College of Engineering & Technology
 Immanuel Arasar JJ College of Engineering
 Jayamatha Engineering College
 Lord Jegannath College of Engineering and Technology
 Loyola Institute of Technology and Science
 Lourdes Mount College of Engineering Technology
 M.E.T. Engineering College
 MAR Ephraem College of Engineering and Technology
 Maria College of Engineering and Technology
 Marthandam College of Engineering and Technology
 Narayanaguru College of Engineering
 Ponjesly College of Engineering
 Rajas Institute of Technology
 Rohini College of Engineering and Technology
 Sigma College of Architecture
 Stella Mary's College of Engineering
 Satyam College of Engineering and Technology
 Sivaji College of Engineering and Technology
 St. Xavier’s Catholic College of Engineering
 Udaya School of Engineering
 VINS Christian College of Engineering
 VINS Christian Women’s College of Engineering

Tenkasi District
 A.R. College of Engineering and Technology, Kadayam
 JP College of Engineering, Ayikudi
 Mahakavi Bharathiyar College of Engineering and Technology, Vasudevanallur
 S. Veerasamy Chettiar College of Engineering and Technology, Puliangudi
 Sardar Raja College of Engineering, Alangulam

Thoothukkudi District
 Dr. G.U. Pope College of Engineering, Sawyerpuram
 Dr. Sivanthi Aditanar College of Engineering, Tiruchendur	
 Grace College of Engineering, Mullakkadu
 Holy Cross Engineering College, Vagaikulam
 Infant Jesus College of Engineering, Keelavallanadu
 Jayaraj Annapackiam CSI College of Engineering, Nazareth
 National Engineering College (Autonomous), Kovilpatti
 St. Mother Theresa Engineering College, Vagaikulam
 Unnamalai Institute of Technology, Kovilpatti
 VV College of Engineering, Arasur

References 

Anna University